Misia Single Collection: 5th Anniversary is Misia's second compilation album, released on December 3, 2003. It sold 52,167 copies in its first week and peaked at #8. Misia Single Collection: 5th Anniversary was released by her previous label, Arista Japan, to commemorate her fifth anniversary.

The album is certified Platinum for shipment of 250,000 copies.

Track listing

Charts

Oricon sales chart

References

External links
Sony Music Online Japan : MISIA

Misia compilation albums
2003 compilation albums
Japanese-language compilation albums